Sidney T. Weinstein was a United States Army lieutenant general.  He is considered by many to be the father of the modern military intelligence corps.

Weinstein graduated from the New Jersey campus of the Admiral Farragut Academy in 1952. He earned a B.S. degree in engineering from the United States Military Academy in 1956 and later received an M.S. degree in business administration from the University of Rochester.

As a major general, Weinstein served as commander of the U.S. Army Intelligence Center and School (USAICS) during the period from August 1982 until August 1985. From 16 August 1985 to 30 September 1989, Weinstein, then a lieutenant general, served as the Deputy Chief of Staff for Intelligence, Headquarters, Department of the Army. Although diminutive in height, Weinstein possessed a larger-than-life personality; one of his trademarks was a penchant for creative profanity.  Upon his retirement, Weinstein became a senior executive with Electronic Warfare Associates in Chantilly, Virginia.

Weinstein died on 24 May 2007 in his home in Great Falls, Virginia. He was interred at Arlington National Cemetery on 14 August 2007.

Weinstein is an inductee of the Military Intelligence Hall of Fame.

References

1934 births
2007 deaths
People from Camden, New Jersey
Admiral Farragut Academy alumni
United States Military Academy alumni
Jewish American military personnel
United States Army personnel of the Vietnam War
Recipients of the Air Medal
University of Rochester alumni
Recipients of the Meritorious Service Medal (United States)
Recipients of the Legion of Merit
United States Army generals
Recipients of the Distinguished Service Medal (US Army)
People from Great Falls, Virginia
Burials at Arlington National Cemetery
20th-century American Jews
21st-century American Jews
Military personnel from New Jersey